The  was a limited express train service operated by West Japan Railway Company (JR West) in Japan. The colour associated with the service was blue.

Station stops
 –  –  –  – – – –  – 

Stations in parentheses were not served by all trains.

Rolling stock
This service was operated with 4-car 183 series electric multiple unit trains based at Fukuchiyama Depot. Some trains operated coupled with 3-car Maizuru sets between Kyoto and Ayabe. Some services had an entire Green (first class) car as car 1, while some services had only half of car 1 providing Green car accommodation.

History
It was upgraded to become an "express" service from 5 March 1966. It was however discontinued from 1 November 1986. The name Tamba comes from the feudal-era Tanba Province, which was situated in what is now northern Kyoto Prefecture and northeastern Hyōgo Prefecture.

From 16 March 1996, the Tamba name was revived for new limited express services operating between Kyoto and Fukuchiyama following the electrification of the Sanin Main Line. From 18 March 2007, all cars were made non-smoking. From the start of the 12 March 2011 timetable revision, Tamba services were absorbed into Kinosaki services.

References

External links
 JR West Tamba 183 series train information 

Named passenger trains of Japan
West Japan Railway Company
Railway services introduced in 1960
Railway services discontinued in 2011

ja:たんば (列車)